McConchie Ridge is a rock spur trending southeast from Salient Peak in the Royal Society Range, Victoria Land, Antarctica. It was named in 1985 by the New Zealand Antarctic Place-Names Committee after John A. McConchie, a field assistant with the New Zealand Antarctic Research Programme geological party to this area, 1979–80, led by R.H. Findlay. McConchie joined the party as a replacement for Adrian Daly who suffered from frostbite.

References

Ridges of Victoria Land
Scott Coast